The men's 800 metres event at the 1971 Pan American Games was held in Cali on 1, 2 and 3 August.

Medalists

Results

Heats

Semifinals

Final

References

Athletics at the 1971 Pan American Games
1971